Twenty or 20 may refer to:
 20 (number), the natural number following 19 and preceding 21
 one of the years 20 BC, AD 20, 1920, 2020

Music

Albums 
 20 (2nd Chapter of Acts album), 1992
 20 (Cunter album), 2011
 20 (Dragana Mirković album), 2012
 20 (Harry Connick, Jr. album), 1988
 20 (Jan Smit album), 2016
 20 (Kate Rusby album), 2012
 20 (Terminaator album), 2007
 20 (TLC album), 2013
 20 (No Angels album), 2021
 #20 (Edmond Leung album), 2011
 20th (album), by Casiopea, 2000
 20 [Twenty], an album released in Japan by South Korean rock band F.T. Island, 2012
 Twenty (Boyz II Men album), 2011
 Twenty (Chicane album), 2016
 Twenty (Jebediah album), 2015
 Twenty (Lynyrd Skynyrd album), 1997
 Twenty (Robert Cray album), 2005
 Twenty (Taking Back Sunday album), 2019

Songs 
 "Twenty" (The Rippingtons song) from 20th Anniversary, 2006
 "Twenty", a song by Karma to Burn from the album Wild, Wonderful Purgatory, 1999

Tours 
 The Twenty Tour, a 2019 music concert tour by Irish pop vocal band Westlife
 Twenty (concert), a 2006 music concert by Filipina singer Regine Velasquez

Places 
 Twenty, Lincolnshire, a hamlet in England
 Twenty railway station, a former railroad station in Lincolnshire, England
 The Twenty, Georgia or West Green, an American unincorporated community in Coffee County
 Twenty Lake, a lake in Minnesota
 Twenty Lakes Basin, in California's eastern Sierra

Other uses 
 20 (TV channel), Italy
 Twenty (film), a 2015 South Korean film
 20, the international dialing code for Egypt.

See also 
 Twenty dollar bill (disambiguation)
 Twenty pence (disambiguation)
 XX (disambiguation)
 XX Corps (disambiguation)
 List of highways numbered 20